The Seoul Open Women's Challenger was a new addition to the ITF Women's Circuit.

Chan Chin-wei and Chuang Chia-jung won the inaugural tournament, defeating Irena Pavlovic and Kristýna Plíšková in the final, 6–4, 6–3.

Seeds

Draw

References 
 Draw

Seoul Open Women's Challenger - Doubles